Fawzi Moussouni (born April 8, 1972 in Algiers, Algeria) is a former Algerian international footballer.

Club career
 1994-2001 JS Kabylie 
 2001-2002 US Creteil 
 2002-2003 NA Hussein Dey 
 2003-2005 JS El Biar 
 2005-2005 JS Kabylie 
 2005-2008 OMR El Annasser 
 2008-2009 USM Bel-Abbès 
 2009-2010. USO Amizour

Honours
 Won the CAF Cup once with JS Kabylie in 2000
 Has 10 caps and 1 goal for the Algeria national football team.

References 

1972 births
Footballers from Algiers
Algerian footballers
Algerian expatriate footballers
Algeria international footballers
Living people
JS Kabylie players
NA Hussein Dey players
US Créteil-Lusitanos players
Expatriate footballers in France
Ligue 2 players
Competitors at the 1993 Mediterranean Games
Mediterranean Games silver medalists for Algeria
Algerian expatriate sportspeople in France
OMR El Annasser players
MC Alger players
USM Bel Abbès players
JS El Biar players
2000 African Cup of Nations players
Association football forwards
Mediterranean Games medalists in football
21st-century Algerian people
20th-century Algerian people